The Mitchell Park Football Club, nicknamed the Lions, is an Australian rules football club that was founded in 1968 by Edward McAvaney, currently playing in the South Australian Amateur Football League, that initially played in the Glenelg-South Adelaide Football Association.

Mitchell Park remained in the Glenelg-South Adelaide Football Association, later known as the Southern Metropolitan Football League, until the end of the 1985 season.

Mitchell Park joined the South Australian Football Association in 1986 and remained in that competition they transferred to the Southern Football League Division 1 competition in 1994. Mitchell Park lasted four seasons in the Division 1 competition before they were relegated to the Division 2 competition in 1998.

In 2001, Mitchell Park left the Southern Football League and joined the South Australian Amateur Football League Division 6 competition and have drifted between Divisions 5, 6 and 7 in the years since.

Mitchell Park also fields junior teams in the Metro South Junior Football League.

A-Grade Premierships
Glenelg-South Adelaide Football Association A2 (2)
1970, 1980
Southern Metropolitan Football League A1 (1)
 1984
South Australian Amateur Football League Division 6 (1)
 2002
South Australian Amateur Football League Division 7 (2)
 2012, 2015

References

External links
 

Australian rules football clubs in South Australia
1968 establishments in Australia
Australian rules football clubs established in 1968
Adelaide Footy League clubs